The Beyazsu chub (Alburnoides emineae) is a species of small (7.6 cm max length) freshwater fish in the family Cyprinidae. It is endemic to Beyazsu Stream in Turkey.

References 

Beyazsu chub
Endemic fauna of Turkey
Freshwater fish of Turkey
Beyazsu chub